Luke Richard Maile (born February 6, 1991) is an American professional baseball catcher for the Cincinnati Reds of Major League Baseball (MLB). He has previously played in MLB for the Tampa Bay Rays, Toronto Blue Jays, Milwaukee Brewers and Cleveland Guardians. Before his professional career, Maile played amateur baseball for Covington Catholic High School and the University of Kentucky.

Amateur career
Maile attended Covington Catholic High School in Park Hills, Kentucky. While there he set school records for batting average, on-base percentage, hits, walks, runs scored, runs batted in (RBIs), doubles, and triples. Maile was named The Cincinnati Enquirers Player of the Year in three of his four years at Covington Catholic, and was named Kentucky's Mr. Baseball in his senior year. He graduated in 2009.

The Red Sox selected Maile in the 43rd round of the 2009 Major League Baseball draft, but he did not sign, because they were not offering enough money. Instead, Maile enrolled at the University of Kentucky, where he played college baseball for the Kentucky Wildcats baseball team. In 2011, he played collegiate summer baseball with the Cotuit Kettleers of the Cape Cod Baseball League. In 2012, his junior year, Maile won the Southeastern Conference (SEC) Player of the Week Award twice, was an All-SEC Second Team member, and was a semifinalist for the Golden Spikes Award as well as the Dick Howser Trophy.

Professional career

Tampa Bay Rays
The Tampa Bay Rays selected Maile in the eighth round, with the 272nd overall selection, of the 2012 Major League Baseball draft. He was assigned to the Short Season-A Hudson Valley Renegades for the entire 2012 season, appearing in 61 games and batting .278 with three home runs and 41 RBIs. In 2013, Maile played in 95 games for the Class-A Bowling Green Hot Rods. He finished the year with a .283 batting average, four home runs, and 49 RBIs. During the offseason, Maile played for the Salt River Rafters of the Arizona Fall League.

In 2014, Maile played for the Montgomery Biscuits of the Double-A Southern League. The Rays promoted him to the Durham Bulls of the Triple-A International League at the end of August, but he did not appear in any games for the Bulls in 2014. In 97 games for Montgomery, Maile hit .268 with five home runs and 37 RBIs. Maile played for the Bulls in 2015, hitting .207 in 89 games, and was promoted to the major leagues on September 1. He appeared in 15 games for the Rays in 2015, and hit .171 with two RBIs.

Maile split time between Durham and Tampa Bay in 2016. He played in 58 games for the Bulls, hitting .242 with two home runs and 12 RBIs. With the Rays, he appeared in 42 games and recorded a .227 batting average with three home runs and 15 RBIs. The Rays designated Maile for assignment on April 2, 2017.

Toronto Blue Jays
The Toronto Blue Jays claimed Maile off waivers on April 6, 2017. On April 28, Maile was recalled from the Triple-A Buffalo Bisons after Jarrod Saltalamacchia was designated for assignment. Maile was placed on the disabled list on July 4 with knee inflammation. An MRI later that day determined he had a torn meniscus. He was activated from the disabled list on September 1. For the 2017 season, Maile hit .146 with two home runs in 46 games.

Maile served as the backup catcher for the 2018 season. He hit .248 with three home runs and 27 RBIs. Maile appeared in only 44 games in 2019 due to an oblique injury, hitting .151 with two home runs. He was non-tendered on December 2 and became a free agent.

Pittsburgh Pirates
On December 16, 2019, Maile signed a deal with the Pittsburgh Pirates. On July 18, 2020, the team announced that Maile would undergo season ending finger surgery after being hit by a pitch in an exhibition game. On October 30, 2020, Maile was outrighted off of the 40-man roster.

Milwaukee Brewers
Maile signed a one-year deal with the Milwaukee Brewers on December 8, 2020. On April 30, 2021, Maile made his Brewers debut, coming in as a pinch runner and staying in the game as the catcher. Maile played in 15 games for the Brewers, hitting .300 with three RBIs. On November 5, Maile elected free agency after rejecting an outright assignment to Triple-A.

Cleveland Guardians
Maile signed a one-year contract with the Cleveland Guardians on March 14, 2022. The Guardians declined to tender Maile a contract for the 2023 season by the non-tender deadline of November 18, 2022; Maile subsequently became a free agent.

Cincinnati Reds
Maile signed a one-year contract with the Cincinnati Reds on November 28, 2022.

Personal life
Maile was married on November 1, 2014 to Paige Maile, née Archinal.

References

External links

1991 births
American expatriate baseball players in Canada
Baseball players from Kentucky
Bowling Green Hot Rods players
Buffalo Bisons (minor league) players
Cleveland Guardians players
Cotuit Kettleers players
Covington Catholic High School alumni
Dunedin Blue Jays players
Durham Bulls players
Hudson Valley Renegades players
Kentucky Wildcats baseball players
Living people
Major League Baseball catchers
Milwaukee Brewers players
Montgomery Biscuits players
Nashville Sounds players
People from Kenton County, Kentucky
Salt River Rafters players
Surprise Saguaros players
Tampa Bay Rays players
Toronto Blue Jays players